The genus Sphenomorphus – vernacularly known as the common skinks – currently serves as a "wastebin taxon" for numerous skinks. While most or all species presently placed here are probably rather close relatives, the genus as presently delimited is likely to be not monophyletic and is in need of review. Some species in this genus have been moved to Pinoyscincus.

The namesake of the Sphenomorphus group of Lygosominae genera, most species would probably occupy a rather basal position therein.

Species

Sphenomorphus acutus  – pointed-headed sphenomorphus
Sphenomorphus aignanus 
Sphenomorphus alfredi 
Sphenomorphus annamiticus  – Perak forest skink, starry forest skink
Sphenomorphus annectens 
Sphenomorphus anomalopus  – long-toed forest skink
Sphenomorphus anotus 
Sphenomorphus apalpebratus 
Sphenomorphus bacboensis 
Sphenomorphus bignelli 
Sphenomorphus brunneus 
Sphenomorphus buenloicus 
Sphenomorphus buettikoferi 
Sphenomorphus cameronicus  – Cameron Highlands forest skink
Sphenomorphus capitolythos 
Sphenomorphus celebensis 
Sphenomorphus cinereus 
Sphenomorphus concinnatus  – elegant forest skink
Sphenomorphus consobrinus 
Sphenomorphus cophias  – Tahan Mountain forest skink
Sphenomorphus courcyanus 
Sphenomorphus cranei  – Crane’s skink
Sphenomorphus crassus 
Sphenomorphus cryptotis 
Sphenomorphus cyanolaemus  – blue-headed forest skink 
Sphenomorphus darlingtoni 
Sphenomorphus dekkerae 
Sphenomorphus derooyae 
Sphenomorphus diwata  – diwata sphenomorphus
Sphenomorphus dussumieri  – Dussumier's forest skink
Sphenomorphus fasciatus  – banded sphenomorphus
Sphenomorphus forbesi  – slender litter skink
Sphenomorphus fragilis 
Sphenomorphus fragosus 
Sphenomorphus fuscolineatus 
Sphenomorphus grandisonae  – Grandison’s forest skink
Sphenomorphus granulatus 
Sphenomorphus haasi 
Sphenomorphus helenae  – Notaburi forest skink
Sphenomorphus incognitus 
Sphenomorphus indicus  – Indian forest skink
Sphenomorphus jobiensis 
Sphenomorphus kinabaluensis 
Sphenomorphus latifasciatus 
Sphenomorphus leptofasciatus 
Sphenomorphus lineopunctulatus  – line-spotted forest skink
Sphenomorphus longicaudatus 
Sphenomorphus loriae 
Sphenomorphus louisiadensis 
Sphenomorphus maculatus  – spotted forest skink, maculated forest skink, stream-side skink  
Sphenomorphus maculicollus 
Sphenomorphus maindroni 
Sphenomorphus malaisei 
Sphenomorphus malayanus  – Malayan forest skink
Sphenomorphus melanopogon 
Sphenomorphus meyeri 
Sphenomorphus microtympanum 
Sphenomorphus mimicus  – dwarf forest skink
Sphenomorphus mimikanus 
Sphenomorphus minutus 
Sphenomorphus modiglianii 
Sphenomorphus muelleri  – 
Sphenomorphus multisquamatus 
Sphenomorphus murudensis 
Sphenomorphus necopinatus 
Sphenomorphus neuhaussi 
Sphenomorphus nigriventris 
Sphenomorphus nigrolabris 
Sphenomorphus nigrolineatus 
Sphenomorphus oligolepis 
Sphenomorphus orientalis 
Sphenomorphus papuae 
Sphenomorphus phuquocensis  – Phu Quoc Island forest skink
Sphenomorphus praesignis  – blotched forest skink
Sphenomorphus pratti 
Sphenomorphus preylangensis  – Prey Lang forest skink
Sphenomorphus puncticentralis 
Sphenomorphus rarus 
Sphenomorphus rufus 
Sphenomorphus sabanus  – Sabah slender skink
Sphenomorphus sanana 
Sphenomorphus sanctus  – Java forest skink
Sphenomorphus sarasinorum 
Sphenomorphus schlegeli 
Sphenomorphus schultzei 
Sphenomorphus scotophilus  – Selangor forest skink
Sphenomorphus scutatus  – Palau ground skink
Sphenomorphus senja 
Sphenomorphus sheai  – Shea's forest skink
Sphenomorphus shelfordi 
Sphenomorphus simus  – common forest skink
Sphenomorphus solomonis 
Sphenomorphus stellatus  – Perak forest skink, starry forest skink
Sphenomorphus striolatus 
Sphenomorphus sungaicolus 
Sphenomorphus taiwanensis 
Sphenomorphus tanahtinggi 
Sphenomorphus tanneri  – Tanner’s skink
Sphenomorphus taylori  – Taylor’s Solomon skink
Sphenomorphus tenuiculus 
Sphenomorphus tersus  – Nakhon Si-Thammarat forest skink, Thai forest skink
Sphenomorphus tetradactylus 
Sphenomorphus tonkinensis  –  Tonkin forest skink
Sphenomorphus transversus 
Sphenomorphus tridigitus 
Sphenomorphus tritaeniatus 
Sphenomorphus tropidonotus 
Sphenomorphus undulatus  – wavy-backed forest skink
Sphenomorphus vanheurni 
Sphenomorphus variegatus 
Sphenomorphus wau 
Sphenomorphus wollastoni 
Sphenomorphus woodfordi 
Sphenomorphus yersini  – Yersin’s forest skink
Sphenomorphus zimmeri 

"Hinulia" elegans, described by Gray in 1838, is unidentified, but may be Eulamprus tenuis,  which is also known as Concinnia tenuis (Gray, 1831).

Range
They are found mainly in Southeast asia but has also been found in India and upwards to China.

References

External links
 (2006). "Using ancient and recent DNA to explore relationships of extinct and endangered Leiolopisma skinks (Reptilia: Scincidae) in the Mascarene islands". Molecular Phylogenetics and Evolution 39 (2): 503–511.  (HTML abstract)
 (2006). "The Southeast Asian scincid lizard Siaphos tridigitus Bourret, 1939 (Reptilia, Scincidae): a second specimen". Zoosystema 28 (3): 785-790. PDF fulltext
 (2008). "A replacement name for Sphenomorphus keiensis (Kopstein, 1926) from the southeastern Moluccas, Indonesia (Reptilia: Squamata: Scincidae) with a redescription of the species". Zoologische Mededelingen Leiden 82 (52): 737-747. PDF

Further reading
Fitzinger L (1843). Systema Reptilium, Fasciculus Primus, Amblyglossae. Vienna: Braumüller & Seidel. 106 pp. + indices. (Sphenomorphus, new genus, p. 23). (in Latin).

 
Lizard genera
Taxa named by Leopold Fitzinger